Jacques Deny (22 October 1916 – 1 January 2016) was a French mathematician. He made notable contributions to the field of analysis, in particular potential theory.

References

External links

1916 births
2016 deaths
People from Algiers
20th-century French mathematicians
University of Strasbourg alumni
Pieds-Noirs
Migrants from French Algeria to France